Latridius minutus, the squarenosed fungus beetle, is a species of minute brown scavenger beetle in the family Latridiidae.

References

Further reading

External links

 

Latridiidae
Beetles described in 1767
Taxa named by Carl Linnaeus